Ruby, My Dear is an album by pianist Kenny Drew recorded in 1977 and released on the SteepleChase label.

Reception
The Allmusic review awarded the album 3 stars.

Track listing
All compositions by Kenny Drew except as indicated
 "Bassment" (Duke Ellington, Billy Strayhorn) - 6:30   
 "Ruby, My Dear" (Thelonious Monk) - 5:57   
 "Gentle Rain" (Luiz Bonfá) - 5:06   
 "Ending" - 7:56   
 "Sunspots" - 9:38   
 "No Slippin'" - 3:44 Bonus track on CD

Personnel
Kenny Drew - piano
David Friesen - bass
Clifford Jarvis - drums

References

Kenny Drew albums
1980 albums
SteepleChase Records albums